The Great Canadian Escape is a Canadian outdoor instructional television miniseries which aired on CBC Television in 1977.

Premise
This series demonstrated techniques for various outdoors activities such as backpacking, camping, canoeing and fishing. John Wells, a broadcaster, hosted this series with Edmonton Journal columnist Russ Thornberry.

Scheduling
This half-hour series was broadcast on Saturdays at 4:00 p.m. from 16 July to 17 September 1977.

References

External links
 

CBC Television original programming
1977 Canadian television series debuts
1977 Canadian television series endings
Television shows filmed in Edmonton